Alosa tanaica, called in English the Azov shad or Black Sea shad, is a species of clupeid fish endemic to the Ponto-Caspian basin. It is an anadromous species, spawning in the lower reaches of rivers. It is widespread in the eastern Black Sea, the Kerch Strait and the Sea of Azov.

The same common names (Black Sea shad, Azov shad) are used also for another species, Alosa maeotica.

References
 

tanaica
Fish of the Black Sea
Fish of the Sea of Azov
Fish described in 1901